Northland Village Mall was a shopping mall located in northwest Calgary, Alberta. The mall opened in 1971, with it being further expanded in 2005. The mall closed in 2021, with demolition to redevelop the mall happening throughout the year 2022 to turn it into an open-air facility. Prior to 2021, Northland Village was a one-level shopping centre (with a small two-level section with over 60 retail shops and services). 

It is located at the intersection of Crowchild Trail and Shaganappi Trail, in the neighbourhoods of Brentwood and Dalhousie.

Retail stores
The mall hosts the anchor stores Best Buy, Winners and Walmart (previously Woolco).

Northland Village underwent renovations in 2003, when it was expanded to accommodate the arrival of new anchor Best Buy and again in 2005, when the bargain cinema was converted into Calgary's first Designer Depot, the Hudson's Bay Co.'s first off-price retail store location in Western Canada.

History

Until 1999, Eaton's was the primary anchor on the north side of mall. This was replaced with a Future Shop until that brand became defunct in 2015.

It is the recipient of a 1998 MAXI Award. for their program to help the impoverished adults

In November 2021, the interior of the mall was mostly closed in preparation for a redevelopment of the site that will see the shopping centre "de-malled" and become an open-air complex, with major reconstruction beginning in January 2022. In mid-January 2022, filming for the TV series The Last of Us took place at the mall, with the shuttered corridors standing in for a post-apocalyptic setting.

References

External links
Official Site
Calgary Travel Guide: Why Northland Village Mall?

Former shopping malls in Alberta
Oxford Properties